The 1993 Copa América was the 36th Copa América, CONMEBOL's football tournament for national teams. It was held in Ecuador between 15 June and 4 July. All 10 CONMEBOL members took part, but for the first time two nations from outside CONMEBOL were invited to take part in the tournament, to round out the format. Mexico and the United States, both of CONCACAF, were the invited teams for this tournament. Argentina defeated Mexico in the final 2–1 to win their record 14th continental championship, also their last senior title until 2021.

It was the first edition of the Copa América in which neither Brazil nor Uruguay finished in the top four. This next occurred in 2015.

Venues

Squads
For a complete list of all participating squads: 1993 Copa América squads

Group stage
The teams were divided into three groups of four teams each. Each team plays one match against each of the other teams within the same group. Two points are awarded for a win, one point for a draw and zero points for a defeat. First and second placed teams, in each group, advance to the quarter-finals. The two best third place teams also advance to the quarter-finals.

 Tie-breaker
 If teams finish leveled on points, the following tie-breakers are used:
 greater goal difference in all group games;
 greater number of goals scored in all group games;
 winner of the head-to-head match between the teams in question;
 drawing of lots.

Group A

Group B

Group C

Ranking of third-placed teams
At the end of the first stage, a comparison was made between the third-placed teams of each group. The two third-placed teams with the best results advanced to the quarter-finals.

Knockout stage

Quarter-finals

Semi-finals

Third-place match

Final

Goal scorers
With four goals, José Luis Dolgetta was the top scorer in the tournament. In total, 64 goals were scored by 41 different players, with one credited as an own goal.

4 goals
  José Luis Dolgetta

3 Goals

  Gabriel Batistuta
  Palhinha
  Ney Avilés
  Eduardo Hurtado
  José del Solar

2 Goals

  Müller
  Richard Zambrano
  Adolfo Valencia
  Álex Aguinaga
  Ángel Fernández
  Zague
  Alberto García Aspe
  David Patiño
  Fernando Kanapkis
  Marcelo Saralegui

1 Goal

  Leonardo Rodríguez
  Oscar Ruggeri
  Diego Simeone
  Marco Etcheverry
  Edmundo
  José Luis Sierra
  Víctor Aristizábal
  Orlando Maturana
  Luis Carlos Perea
  Freddy Rincón
  Carlos Antonio Muñoz
  Raúl Noriega
  Benjamín Galindo
  Ramón Ramírez
  Hugo Sánchez
  Roberto Cabañas
  Luis Monzón
  Juan Reynoso
  Santiago Ostolaza
  Alexi Lalas
  Chris Henderson
  Dominic Kinnear
  Miguel Echenausi
  Stalin Rivas

Own goal
  Mario Ramírez

Final positions

References

 
Copa América tournaments
1993 in South American football
1993 in Ecuadorian football
International association football competitions hosted by Ecuador
June 1993 sports events in South America
July 1993 sports events in South America
Sports competitions in Guayaquil
20th century in Guayaquil
Sports competitions in Quito
20th century in Quito
Ambato, Ecuador
Machala